FK Mohelnice is a Czech football club located in Mohelnice in the Olomouc Region. Since the 2018–19 season, it plays in the fifth tier of Czech football. The clubs FK Mohelnice and Tatran Moravičany merged in 1995 to become FK Mohelnice–Moravičany. The club has taken part in the Czech Cup on a number of occasions.

Controversy
In 2017, the club was purchased by a Chinese investor. This led to a flurry of seemingly irrational transfer activity and suspicions of match fixing. In early 2018, the Czech Football Association reported their findings about the situation to the police and the organized crime department launched an investigation of the club and its owners. On 5 February, an unnamed Mohelnice player came forward as a witness, admitting to having been complicit in fixing a Third Division match, being both blackmailed and offered bribes by a teammate to deliberately make defensive errors during the match.

References

External links
 
Team profile at soccerway.com

Football clubs in the Czech Republic
Association football clubs established in 1946
Sport in the Olomouc Region
Šumperk District